A list of senators of France by the department that they have represented:

Metropolitan France

Ain
Aisne
Allier
Alpes-de-Haute-Provence
Alpes-Maritimes
Ardèche
Ardennes
Ariège
Aube
Aude
Aveyron
Bas-Rhin
Bouches-du-Rhône
Calvados
Cantal
Charente
Charente-Maritime
Cher
Corrèze
Corse-du-Sud
Côte-d'Or
Côtes-d'Armor
Creuse
Deux-Sèvres
Dordogne
Doubs
Drôme
Essonne
Eure
Eure-et-Loir
Finistère
Gard
Gers
Gironde
Hautes-Alpes
Haute-Corse
Haute-Garonne
Haute-Loire
Haute-Marne
Hautes-Pyrénées
Haut-Rhin
Haute-Saône
Haute-Savoie
Hauts-de-Seine
Haute-Vienne
Hérault
Ille-et-Vilaine
Indre
Indre-et-Loire
Isère
Jura
Landes
Loir-et-Cher
Loire
Loire-Atlantique
Loiret
Lot
Lot-et-Garonne
Lozère
Maine-et-Loire
Manche
Marne
Mayenne
Meurthe-et-Moselle
Meuse
Morbihan
Moselle
Nièvre
Nord
Oise
Orne
Paris
Pas-de-Calais
Puy-de-Dôme
Pyrénées-Atlantiques
Pyrénées-Orientales
Rhône
Saône-et-Loire
Sarthe
Savoie
Seine-Maritime
Seine-et-Marne
Seine-Saint-Denis
Somme
Tarn
Tarn-et-Garonne
Territoire de Belfort
Val-de-Marne
Val-d'Oise
Var
Vaucluse
Vendée
Vienne
Vosges
Yonne
Yvelines

Overseas departments

French citizens living abroad
French Guiana
French Polynesia
Guadeloupe
Martinique
Mayotte
New Caledonia
Réunion
Saint Barthélemy
Saint Martin
Saint Pierre and Miquelon
Wallis and Futuna

Former French departments

French West Africa
French East Africa
French Equatorial Africa
French Algeria
French India
Corsica
Seine 
Seine-et-Oise

List